Lyudmila Agranovskaya (29 February 1932 – 18 December 2022) was a Soviet and Russians mountain climber.

Agranovskaya was born on 29 February 1932. She was the first woman in the USSR to receive the Snow Leopard award. She was a Honorary Master of Sports of the USSR, Honored Coach of the RSFSR, and Honorary Citizen of Petropavlovsk-Kamchatsky (2006).

Agranovskaya died on 18 December 2022, aged 90.

References 

1932 births
2022 deaths
Soviet mountain climbers
Russian mountain climbers
Honoured Coaches of Russia